Sonny Stitt/Bud Powell/J. J. Johnson (also released as All God's Children Got Rhythm) is an album by saxophonist Sonny Stitt compiling tracks recorded with trombonist J. J. Johnson or pianist Bud Powell in 1949–50 and released on the Prestige label in 1957. The 1990 CD reissue added five bonus tracks to the original LP.  The cover art was done by cartoonist Don Martin of MAD magazine fame.

Reception
The Allmusic review stated "This superb CD reissues the complete output of three classic bop sessions... Highly recommended music".

Track listing 
All compositions by Sonny Stitt except as indicated
 "All God's Chillun Got Rhythm" (Walter Jurmann, Gus Kahn, Bronisław Kaper) – 2:57    
 "Sonnyside" – 2:21    
 "Bud's Blues" – 2:32    
 "Sunset" – 3:44    
 "Fine and Dandy" (Paul James, Kay Swift) – 2:39    
 "Fine and Dandy" [alternate take] (James, Swift) – 2:38 Bonus track on CD reissue      
 "Strike Up the Band" (George Gershwin, Ira Gershwin) – 3:26    
 "I Want to Be Happy" (Irving Caesar, Vincent Youmans) – 3:09    
 "Taking a Chance on Love" (Vernon Duke, Ted Fetter, John Latouche) – 2:32    
 "Afternoon in Paris" (John Lewis) – 3:03    
 "Afternoon in Paris" [alternate take] (Lewis) – 2:59 Bonus track on CD reissue    
 "Elora" (J.J. Johnson) – 3:03    
 "Elora" [alternate take] (Johnson) – 3:07 Bonus track on CD reissue    
 "Teapot" (Johnson) – 2:43    
 "Teapot" [alternate take] (Johnson) – 3:01 Bonus track on CD reissue    
 "Blue Mode" (Johnson) – 3:45    
 "Blue Mode" [alternate take] (Johnson) – 2:49 Bonus track on CD reissue  
Recorded in New York City on October 17, 1949 (tracks 10–17), December 11, 1949 (tracks 1–4) and January 26, 1950 (tracks 5–9)

Personnel 
Sonny Stitt – tenor saxophone
J. J. Johnson – trombone (tracks 10–17)
John Lewis (tracks 10–17), Bud Powell (tracks 1–9) – piano
Nelson Boyd (tracks 10–17), Curly Russell (tracks 1–9) – bass
Max Roach – drums

References 

1956 compilation albums
Prestige Records compilation albums
Sonny Stitt compilation albums
Bud Powell compilation albums
J. J. Johnson compilation albums